Ahmad Mashhadi, also known as Mir Seyyed Ahmad, was an important Persian Nastaliq calligrapher in the 16th century. He was from Mashhad. He was also a poet and some of his original poems still exist.

Biography 
Mashhadi learnt calligraphy art in Herat under Mir Ali Heravi. After that Shaybanids captured the city, both of them immigrated to Bukhara. After Heravi's death, he worked some time as a scrivener in the library of Abdolaziz Khan Ozbak. When Abdolaziz Khan died, he came back to his home town. He worked there as a scrivener in the court of Tahmasp I and his successor Ismail II. He died in 1578 in Mazandaran.

His students 
 Hassan Ali Mashhadi
 Ali Reza Mashhadi
 Mohammad Rahim Mashhadi
 Ghanei
 Mohammad Hossein Tabrizi
 Ahmad Monshi Ghomi, the author of the book Golestan-e Honar.

References 

People from Mashhad
1578 deaths
16th-century calligraphers of Safavid Iran